Titron, also known as Durraj Pur, is a town and a nagar panchayat in Saharanpur district in the Indian state of Uttar Pradesh.

Geography
It has an average elevation of 267 metres (954 feet).

Fame
Due to fertile land Titron is famous for mango  production.  It consists of a large green belt under mango trees.

Origin of Titron
There is no conformed History for Titron. But according to some resources the Qazi of the Mughal Emperor had a huge castle build and remains are still there .

Many Treasures have been found although not in perfect form.

Demographics
 India census, Titron had a population of 10898. Males constitute 52.13% of the population and females 47.86%. Titron has an average literacy rate of 67.69%, lower than the national average of 74.04%: male literacy is 77.14%, and female literacy is 57.41%. In Titron, 12% of the population is under 6 years of age.
Most of the population is based in the agricultural industry. 
The telephone STD code for Titron is 01331 The Postal PIN for Titron is 247343.

References

Cities and towns in Kurukshetra district